The Lady Without Camelias is a 1953 Italian black-and-white drama film directed by Michelangelo Antonioni and starring Lucia Bosé, Gino Cervi, and Andrea Checchi. Based on a story by Antonioni, the film is about a new starlet who is discovered and her experiences in Italian films. The film has been called "Antonioni's most unjustly neglected fiction feature." Filmed on location in Rome and Venice, The Lady Without Camelias was released on 27 February 1953 in Italy.

Plot
A young shop assistant named Clara Manni (Lucia Bosé) is selected by movie executive Gianni (Andrea Checchi) for his new film, Woman without Destiny. When test screenings reveal that the public is enamoured with Clara, but less enthusiastic about the film itself, producer Ercole (Gino Cervi) sees an opportunity to take advantage of his actress' shapely presence and spice the film up a bit, with less attention to detail and more overt displays of passion. Clara becomes compromised when she marries Gianni, who becomes jealous over the provocative marketing for her film, and categorically states that he doesn't want her involved with it anymore. She reluctantly agrees, and after requesting a more serious vehicle for her, they set about on a new version of the daunting trial of Joan of Arc, with Gianni in the director's chair. The film is panned when premiered at the Venice Film Festival, and with both their reputations in tatters, Clara is forced to evaluate their marriage and the career that she has embarked upon.

Cast
Lucia Bosé as Clara Manni
Gino Cervi as Ercole
Andrea Checchi as Gianni Franchi
Ivan Desny as Nardo Rusconi
Monica Clay as Simonetta
Alain Cuny as Lodi
Gisella Sofio as Simonetta's Friend
Anna Carena as Clara's mother
Enrico Glori as Director

Production
The film's sets were designed by the art director Gianni Polidori. It was made at the Cinecittà Studios, which also appear as a setting in the film.
Filming locations
Rome, Lazio, Italy 
Venice, Veneto, Italy

Release
The movie was released on Blu-ray and DVD on 21 March 2011 in the United Kingdom.

References

External links
(24 March 1981), ANTONIONI'S 'LADY' The New York Times.

1953 films
Italian black-and-white films
1950s Italian-language films
1953 drama films
Films set in Rome
Films directed by Michelangelo Antonioni
Films with screenplays by Suso Cecchi d'Amico
Films scored by Giovanni Fusco
Films shot at Cinecittà Studios
Films shot in Venice
Films set in Venice
Italian drama films
1950s Italian films